The Marijedi (Mariyedi) are an indigenous Australian people of the Northern Territory.

Country
The Marijedi's territory, predominantly swampland, covered an estimated , extending westwards from Mount Greenwood, and reaching north toward Cape Scott.

Alternative names
 Murijadi (a Murrinh-Patha exonym applied to the Marijedi).

Notes

Citations

Sources

Aboriginal peoples of the Northern Territory